San Marone may refer to:

 San Marone, a 4th-century Syrian Syriac Christian hermit monk
 San Marone, Civitanova Marche, a Roman Catholic church located in the Italian comune of Civitanova Marche
 San Marone, Rome, a church in Rome
 San Marone Martire, Monteleone di Fermo, a Roman Catholic parish church in Monteleone di Fermo

See also 

 Marone (disambiguation)